= Amarpura, Bhopal =

Amarpura अमरपुरा
- village
- Etymology: "Immortal Town"
- Location within Madhya Pradesh Location within India
- Coordinates: 23.133533°N 77.314692°E
- Country: India
- State: Madhya Pradesh
- District: Bhopal
- Tehsil: Huzur

Population (2011)
  - Total: 194
- Time zone: UTC+5:30 (IST)
- ISO 3166 code: MP-IN
- Census code: 482522

Amarpura is a village in the Bhopal district of Madhya Pradesh, India. It is located in the Huzur tehsil and the Phanda block.

== Demographics ==
According to the 2011 census of India, Amarpura has 43 households. The effective literacy rate (i.e. the literacy rate of population excluding children aged 6 and below) is 52.17%.

Demographics (2011 Census)
	Total	Male	Female
Population	194	99	95
Children aged below 6 years	33	15	18
Scheduled caste	189	97	92
Scheduled tribe	0	0	0
Literates	84	52	32
Workers (all)	59	49	10
Main workers (total)	8	5	3
Main workers: Cultivators	6	4	2
Main workers: Agricultural labourers	0	0	0
Main workers: Household industry workers	0	0	0
Main workers: Other	2	1	1
Marginal workers (total)	51	44	7
Marginal workers: Cultivators	4	4	0
Marginal workers: Agricultural labourers	38	32	6
Marginal workers: Household industry workers	0	0	0
Marginal workers: Others	9	8	1
Non-workers	135	50	85
